Kentland Municipal Airport  is a public use airport located one nautical mile (2 km) southeast of the central business district of Kentland, in Newton County, Indiana, United States. It is owned by the Kentland Board of Aviation Commissioners. This airport was included in the National Plan of Integrated Airport Systems for 2011–2015, which categorized it as a general aviation facility.

Facilities and aircraft 
Kentland Municipal Airport covers an area of 50 acres (20 ha) at an elevation of 698 feet (213 m) above mean sea level. It has one runway designated 9/27 with an asphalt surface measuring 3,504 by 50 feet (1,068 x 15 m).

For the 12-month period ending December 31, 2011, the airport had 5,852 aircraft operations, an average of 16 per day: 90% general aviation and 10% air taxi. At that time there were 19 aircraft based at this airport: 63% single-engine, 11% multi-engine, and 26% ultralight.

See also 
 List of airports in Indiana

References

External links 
 
 Aerial image as of April 1998 from USGS The National Map
 
 

Airports in Indiana
Transportation buildings and structures in Newton County, Indiana